The Sanremo Music Festival 1985 was the 35th annual Sanremo Music Festival, held at the Teatro Ariston in Sanremo, Italy, between 7 and 9 February 1985 and broadcast on Rai 1.

The show was hosted by Pippo Baudo, assisted by Patty Brard.

The winner of the Big Artists section was Ricchi e Poveri with the song "Se m'innamoro", while Matia Bazar won the Critics Award with the song "Souvenir".

Claudio Baglioni intervened to receive the "Italian Song of the Century" award for the song Questo piccolo grande amore. The singer-songwriter was the only artist, in this edition dominated by the play-back, to perform live (with the same award-winning song), accompanying himself on the piano alone.

Cinzia Corrado won the "Newcomers" section with the song "Niente di più".

Participants and results

Big Artists

Newcomers

References 

Sanremo Music Festival by year
1985 in Italian music
1985 music festivals